John Crosby AM is an Australian farmer and chairman of Free Eyre Ltd and its subsidiary, Peninsula Ports Pty Ltd. The company intends to build Port Spencer for the export of grain on a site adjacent to Lipson Cove on Eyre Peninsula in South Australia.

Career 
Crosby graduated from the University of Adelaide in the class of 1969–70. He held senior positions with the National Farmers Federation and Agribusiness Association of Australia. During his time at the National Farmers Federation, Crosby worked on the floating of Elders Limited, which was previously an asset of Fosters. Crosby is a former General Manager of the Dairy Authority of South Australia Chair of the Agribusiness Advisory Board at the University of Adelaide. Crosby has farmed cattle at Lucindale in South Australia and has exported beef to Vietnam. 

In 2012, his property interests at Lucindale, which he owned with his wife, covered some 900 hectares. In 2019, Crosby sold 598 hectares of his land at Lucindale to neighbouring farmers. 

In 2021, Crosby was awarded a Member of the Order of Australia for his significant service to agribusiness, and to the farming sector.

Personal life 

Crosby is married to former Liberal Party Senator Mary-Jo Fisher. He has three children from his first marriage, David, James, and political pollster Raphaella Kathryn Crosby. Political strategist Sir Lynton Crosby is his second cousin.

References 

Australian farmers
Living people
20th-century Australian businesspeople
21st-century Australian businesspeople
Year of birth missing (living people)